The Barrie Flyers were a junior ice hockey team in the Ontario Hockey Association from 1945 to 1960, from Barrie, Ontario. The Flyers played home games at the Barrie Arena from 1945 to 1960.

History
The Barrie Flyers junior team was founded in 1945 by Leighton "Hap" Emms. The franchise was soon affiliated with the Boston Bruins of the NHL. Barrie quickly became a powerhouse in the OHA. They appeared in the Memorial Cup three times, losing the first time in 1948, then winning twice, in 1951 and 1953. The Emms family relocated the team to Niagara Falls in 1960 where the team continued to win and played for 12 seasons, then relocated to Sudbury to become the Sudbury Wolves.

1948 Memorial Cup
Barrie won the right to play for the cup by defeating the Windsor Spitfires for the OHA championship, and the Montreal Nationales to win the Richardson Trophy as eastern Canadian representatives.

The Flyers were runners up for the Memorial Cup in 1948 played at Maple Leaf Gardens. They were swept by the Port Arthur West End Bruins (now Thunder Bay) in a best-of-seven series.

The series was very physical and bitter between the teams. After the third game, Emms threatened that the Flyers would not continue to play without a change in referees. The series ultimately continued with the same referees.

 Game 1  Port Arthur 10 vs. Barrie  8
 Game 2  Port Arthur  8 vs. Barrie  1
 Game 3  Port Arthur  5 vs. Barrie  4
 Game 4  Port Arthur  9 vs. Barrie  8 (OT)

1951 Memorial Cup

Barrie won the OHA championship defeating the Toronto Marlboros.

Canadian Amateur Hockey Association vice-president W. B. George oversaw the Flyers versus Quebec Citadels series for the George Richardson Memorial Trophy, to represent Eastern Canada in the 1951 Memorial Cup playoffs. When the Citadels refused to play game five in Barrie, George gave them an ultimatum to play or forfeit the series. Quebec decided to play too late to arrive by train, but arrived half an hour late after flying. George scheduled game seven on neutral ice at Maple Leaf Gardens, despite protests from Flyers' coach Hap Emms who claimed that his team only agreed to resume the series if game seven was played in Barrie.

The Flyers won the Memorial Cup in 1951 played at Winnipeg and Brandon, Manitoba. They swept the Winnipeg Monarchs in a best-of-seven series.

 Game 1  Barrie 5 vs. Winnipeg 1
 Game 2  Barrie 5 vs. Winnipeg 1
 Game 3  Barrie 4 vs. Winnipeg 3
 Game 4  Barrie 9 vs. Winnipeg 5

1953 Memorial Cup
Barrie won the right to play for the cup by defeating the St. Michael's Majors for the OHA championship. The Flyers won the Memorial Cup in 1953 played at Winnipeg and Brandon, Manitoba. They defeated the St. Boniface Canadiens in a best-of-seven series.

 Game 1  Barrie 6 vs. St. Boniface 4
 Game 2  Barrie 6 vs. St. Boniface 3
 Game 3  Barrie 7 vs. St. Boniface 5
 Game 4  Barrie 4 vs. St. Boniface 7
 Game 5  Barrie 6 vs. St. Boniface 1

Championships
The Barrie Flyers were a dominant team during the late 1940s and early 1950s, and one of a few clubs to win multiple Memorial Cup championships. The Flyers won the Ontario championship 4 times, the Eastern Canadian championship 3 times, and the national championship twice.

Memorial Cup appearances
 1948, Lost to Port Arthur West End Bruins
 1951, CAHA Champions vs. Winnipeg Monarchs
 1953, CAHA Champions vs. St. Boniface Canadiens

George Richardson Memorial Trophy appearances
 1948, Champions vs. Montreal Nationales
 1949, Lost to Montreal Royals
 1951, Champions vs. Quebec Citadels
 1953, Champions vs. Quebec Citadels

J. Ross Robertson Cup appearances
 1947–48, OHA Champions vs. Windsor Spitfires
 1948–49, OHA Champions vs. Toronto Marlboros
 1950–51, OHA Champions vs. Toronto Marlboros
 1952–53, OHA Champions vs. St. Michael's Majors
 1955–56, Lost to Toronto Marlboros

Players

Award winners
1948-49 - Gil Mayer, Red Tilson Trophy Most Outstanding Player
1950-51 - Lorne Howes, Dave Pinkney Trophy Lowest Team Goals Against

NHL alumni
List of Flyers' alumni who played in the National Hockey League (NHL):

Barry Ashbee
Bob Barlow
Bob Beckett
Bob Blackburn
Ross Brooks
Kelly Burnett
Dick Cherry
Don Cherry
Real Chevrefils
Murray Davison
Marv Edwards
Pierre Gagne
Ray Gariepy
Jeannot Gilbert
Howie Glover
Bill Knibbs
Leo Labine
Stan Long
Wayne Maxner
Gilles Mayer
Don McKenney
Sid McNabney
Paul Meger
Hillary Menard
Doug Mohns
Jim Morrison
Tony Poeta
Dan Poliziani
George Ranieri
Gerry Reid
Dale Rolfe
Wayne Rutledge
Myron Stankiewicz
Ron Stewart
Alan "Skip" Teal
Orval Tessier
Jerry Toppazzini
Ed Westfall
Larry Zeidel

Regular season results

References

1945 establishments in Ontario
1960 disestablishments in Ontario
Defunct Ontario Hockey League teams
Ice hockey clubs established in 1945
Sport in Barrie
Sports clubs disestablished in 1960
Boston Bruins minor league affiliates